Kieron Richard Baker (born 29 October 1949) is an English retired professional footballer who made over 210 appearances as a goalkeeper in the Football League for AFC Bournemouth. He also played in Canada.

Career

Early years 
A goalkeeper, Baker began his career as an apprentice at First Division club Fulham in 1965. He played for the Cottagers' youth and reserve teams, but left the club in 1967, to return to his native Isle of Wight for a short spell with Ryde County Old Boys.

AFC Bournemouth 
Baker returned to the mainland to sign for Third Division club Bournemouth & Boscombe Athletic in July 1967. He had to wait until the 1969–70 season to make his debut and made 17 league appearances in a disastrous season which saw the Cherries relegated to Fourth Division. A return to Third Division football in 1971 (under the name 'AFC Bournemouth') saw Baker make just 13 league appearances over the following three seasons, during which he spent periods away on loan at North American Soccer League club Montreal Olympique and Third Division club Brentford.

Baker finally broke through into the first team during the 1973–74 season, when he made 33 league appearances. He was a regular in goal until the end of the 1977–78 season and missed just five league matches in each of his final two seasons at Dean Court. Baker departed Bournemouth in June 1978, having made 248 appearances in 11 years for the club. He was awarded a testimonial for his service to the club, though the match didn't take place.

Later professional career 
In a surprise move, Baker signed for First Division club Ipswich Town for a £20,000 fee during the 1978 off-season. He failed to make a first team appearance and instead made 18 Football Combination appearances for the reserves and had a non-playing loan spell at East Anglian rivals Norwich City. An injury forced Baker to retire from football at the end of the 1978–79 season, but he returned to football to sign for new American Soccer League club Phoenix Fire in early 1980, linking up with former Bournemouth teammate Harry Redknapp. The club folded due to financial irregularities before the beginning of the 1980 season.

Non-League football 
Baker returned to England and linked up again with Harry Redknapp (now assistant to manager Bobby Moore) at Isthmian League First Division club Oxford City in 1980. He made 38 appearances for the club. Baker moved back to the south coast to sign for Alliance Premier League club Weymouth in June 1981. He established himself in the first team and made 110 appearances before departing in 1983. Baker followed Weymouth teammates Trevor Finnegan, Gary Borthwick and Billy Elliott to Alliance Premier League club Yeovil Town in 1983. He made 21 appearances before retiring in November 1983.

Career statistics

References

External links
Profile on the Pride of Anglia Website

1949 births
Living people
English footballers
Fulham F.C. players
Brentford F.C. players
Ipswich Town F.C. players
AFC Bournemouth players
Association football goalkeepers
Montreal Olympique players
North American Soccer League (1968–1984) players
English expatriate footballers
Expatriate soccer players in Canada
Norwich City F.C. players
Oxford City F.C. players
Weymouth F.C. players
Isthmian League players
National League (English football) players
Footballers from the Isle of Wight
Yeovil Town F.C. players
English expatriate sportspeople in Canada
Phoenix Fire (soccer) players